Gonbaki may refer to:
Gonbaki District
Gonbaki Rural District